Joseph Hayes (born 4 January 1976) is a former professional rugby league footballer who played in the 1990s and 2000s.

Club career
Hayes played  and scored a try in St. Helens' 16–25 defeat by Wigan in the 1995–96 Regal Trophy Final during the 1995–96 at Alfred McAlpine Stadium, Huddersfield on Saturday 13 January 1996.

After retiring as a player, Hayes re-joined St Helens as a physiotherapist, a role which he held until 2014.

International honours
Joey Hayes won a cap for Great Britain while at St. Helens in 1996 against Papua New Guinea.

References

External links
!Great Britain Statistics at englandrl.co.uk (statistics currently missing due to not having appeared for both Great Britain, and England)
Profile at saints.org.uk
Injured Hayes Misses Wembley
Profile at saintsrlfc.com

1976 births
Living people
English rugby league players
Great Britain national rugby league team players
Oldham R.L.F.C. players
Place of birth missing (living people)
Rugby league wingers
Salford Red Devils players
St Helens R.F.C. players